Breakdown is a 1952 American crime film noir directed by Edmond Angelo starring Ann Richards, William Bishop and Anne Gwynne. It was the last film of Richards before she retired.

The film was also known as Decision.

Plot
Framed for murder, heavyweight boxer Terry Williams (Bishop) is sent to prison, but is released after a few years on good behavior. He becomes a championship contender and then, on the eve of the big fight, finds the man who can prove that he was framed for the crime for which he served time.

Cast
Ann Richards as June Hannum
William Bishop as Terry Williams 
Anne Gwynne as Candy Allen
Sheldon Leonard as Nick Samson
Wally Cassell as Pete Samson
Richard Benedict as Punchy
Joe McTurk as Longshot McGinnis
John Vosper as Judge Sam Hannum
Roy Engel as Al Bell
Norman Rainey as Doc
Hal Baylor as Joe Thompson
Elena Sirangelo as Mrs. Prescott
Gene Covelli as Gumbo, the newsboy
Michelle King as Girl in Audience
Al Cantor as Joe DeVito

Production
Pegasus Productions was a company headed by Max Gifford which announced they were going to make three films. One of these was The Slasher based on a play by Robert Abel. Abel had been a prize fighter for four years. He had written a play The Big Shot which was produced on stage in 1951, directed by Edmund Angelo.

Abel then wrote The Slasher and Angelo signed to direct. His wife Ann Richards played the female lead. It was Richards' first film in three years. It was then known as Decisions.

Filming started 1 December 1951 at Republic Studios. Filming went for eleven days.

Pegagus' second production was to be You're Not So Dangerous and was to star Richards as a social worker confused for a gangster's moll.

References

External links
 
 
 

1952 films
1950s English-language films
1952 crime drama films
American crime drama films
Films scored by Paul Dunlap
American black-and-white films
1950s American films